The Journal of the Society for American Music, published quarterly, is a peer-reviewed academic journal and the official journal of the Society for American Music. It is published by Cambridge University Press and edited by Loren Kajikawa at George Washington University. The journal is the continuation of American Music, which was first published Spring 1983 (Vol. 1, No. 1), and obtained its current title in spring 2007.

Selected people 
 Allen Perdue Britton (1914–2003), founding editor
 Irving Lowens (1916–1983), founding book review editor
 
 Richard Jackson, founding bibliographer

External links 
 

Music journals
Cambridge University Press academic journals
Quarterly journals
Publications established in 1983
English-language journals
Academic journals associated with learned and professional societies of the United States